8 South African Armoured Division was a formation of the South African Army, active from the 1970s to 1999.

History
8 South African Division was established as an Armoured Formation on August 1, 1974, consisting of 81 Armoured Brigade, 82 Mechanised Brigade and 84 Motorised Brigade. It was, in many respects, a mirror of 7th South African Infantry Division.

A provisional 1977 order of battle had 8 Armoured Division organised as follows:

Divisional Breakdown

Divisional Level Attached Units

Artillery, maintenance, engineers, signals and provost (Military Police)

Brigades

81 Armoured Brigade

Headquartered in Pretoria, 81 Armoured Brigade consisted of the following units:

82 Mechanised Brigade
Headquartered in Potchefstroom, 82 Mechanised Brigade consisted of the following units:

South West Africa Angolan theater
During Operation Packer which succeeded Operation Hooper in March 1988, 82 Mechanised Brigade protected the eastern bank of the Cuito River. During this operation, FAPLA forces suffered losses and the situation on the eastern bank stabilised to such an extent that Operation Displace could be started. During this phase the South African forces withdrew from Angola.

83 Mechanised Brigade
83 Mechanised Brigade was never activated.

84 Motorised Brigade
Headquartered in Durban, 84 Brigade was formed in Durban as part of 8 South African Armoured Armoured Division on August 1, 1974 and its official establishment was authorized on September 10 of that year. Brigadier G. Wolmarans was authorized as its first commanding officer with Commandant W.P. Sass, Maj H.L. Bosman, and Capt J.E. Samuales as staff officers posted to headquarters.
The new Brigade was located at Lords Grounds.

84 Motorised Brigade consisted of the following units:

Leadership

Inter-divisional Reorganizing
By 1985, 8 Division consisted of 81 Armoured Brigade, 84 Motorised Brigade and 72 Motorised Brigade. 82 Mechanised Brigade  had been transferred to the command of 7th South African Infantry Division.

Mobilisation

Insignia

Disbanding

Brigade Disbanding
8 Division’s Brigades were disbanded in 1992 and the battalions and regiments came to answer directly to the divisional headquarters - the thinking was that these would be grouped into task forces as required. The concept was never put to a serious test. The Formation was also renamed 8 South African Division.

Divisional Disbanding
The Division was effectively disbanded on April 1, 1997, when its former units became part of 7th South African Infantry Division as 74 Brigade.

Notes

References

 Cock, J. Laurie, N. War and Society: The Militarisation of South Africa, published by David Phillip, 1989 

Armoured units and formations of South Africa
Infantry divisions of South Africa
Disbanded military units and formations in Durban
Military units and formations established in 1974
Military units and formations disestablished in 1999
1999 establishments in South Africa